Martti Järventaus (born December 16, 1960 in Kotka, Finland) is a retired male breaststroke swimmer from Finland. He competed twice for his native country at the Summer Olympics: in 1980 and 1984.

References
sports-reference

1960 births
Living people
Finnish male breaststroke swimmers
Swimmers at the 1980 Summer Olympics
Swimmers at the 1984 Summer Olympics
Olympic swimmers of Finland
People from Kotka
Sportspeople from Kymenlaakso